Cleodoxus lineaticollis is a species of longhorn beetles of the subfamily Lamiinae. It was described by Gounelle in 1910, and is known from Ecuador.

References

Beetles described in 1910
Acanthocinini